Sandra "Sandy" Pasch (née Kawczynski; born May 19, 1954) is an American nurse and Democratic politician.  She served six years in the Wisconsin State Assembly (2009–2015), representing north-central Milwaukee County.

Background 
Pasch was born Sandra Kawczynski in Milwaukee, on May 19, 1954.  She graduated from Bay View High School in 1972; received a bachelor's degree in nursing at the University of Wisconsin–Madison in 1976; a Master of Science in Psychiatric-Mental Health Nursing at the University of Rochester in 1981; and a Master of Arts in Bioethics at the Medical College of Wisconsin in 1999. She worked as an assistant professor at Columbia College of Nursing; as a clinical nurse specialist; and as a community health nurse.

Elective office 
Pasch was elected to the assembly in 2008. After winning a four-way Democratic primary with a narrow plurality, she easily defeated Republican nominee Yash P. Wadhwa by 21,938 to 10,720. She was assigned to the standing committees on public health (serving as vice chair); on corrections and the courts; on criminal justice; on health and healthcare reform; and on housing.

In 2009, Pasch's campaign records showed that she received two contributions totaling $125 on February 18, during budget negotiations. This violated a new rule, passed two weeks prior, which restricted lawmakers from soliciting or accepting campaign contributions until the state budget was voted into law. According to Pasch, the date was a typo, and she did not receive any contributions after the budget negotiations began.

Sandy Pasch voted to pass the 2009 Wisconsin budget.

Pasch voted against censuring State Representative Jeffrey Wood after being arrested for driving while intoxicated and being in possession of THC and drug paraphernalia.

Pasch voted against requiring a two-thirds majority in the legislature in order to pass legislation to increase taxes.

On May 6, 2011, Pasch announced that she would be running for the Wisconsin State Senate's 8th District against incumbent Republican Alberta Darling, who was the subject of a recall election.  She won her primary against a "fake Democrat", Gladys Huber, with over 60% of the votes cast, but lost the general election by an 8% margin.

The Milwaukee Journal Sentinel PolitiFact rated claims that Pasch made regarding Paul Ryan's budget plan "Pants On Fire", which is its strongest rating for falsehoods, stating that she was "mixing false and ridiculous". PolitiFact rated claims that Pasch made on June 14, 2011, regarding State Sen. Darling's vote on the state budget as "Mostly True", stating that Pasch's figures were accurate, but needed "clarification and additional information".

Pasch serves on the board of Citizen Action of Wisconsin, a group which supported Pasch in the recall election.  The treasurer of her campaign also serves as treasurer of Citizen Action. In August, Republicans filed a complaint alleging possible illegal coordination between Citizen Action of Wisconsin and Pasch's senate campaign. Both Pasch and the director of Citizen Action stated that there was no coordination whatsoever between the two

2012 race 
After her district was basically eliminated by the Republican-controlled legislature in 2011, Pasch announced that she would be moving from her home in Whitefish Bay into the Assembly district then represented by Elizabeth Coggs (who was running for the State Senate), which had been redistricted to include portions of Pasch's old district. Amid accusations of "carpetbagging" and assertions that up to half the seats currently held by African-Americans could go to white candidates, Pasch argued that "I agree diversity is important... But what is very, very important is that there is a representative in the district who will listen, who will take action after listening, someone who will fight"; and noted she is the only Jewish member of the Assembly. She was endorsed by Tamara Grigsby.

Calls by Coggs to the mostly-black voters at an inner-city candidate forum to "vote for someone who looks like you" led to accusations that she was attacking Pasch, the only white candidate in the race. Several African-American candidates at the forum decried her remarks as racist. None of Pasch's opponents (who included Ieshuh Griffin) had held elected office. "I don't think anyone should vote for anyone on account of their skin color," Griffin said of Coggs' remarks. "It's not about color.". Coggs' predecessor, Polly Williams, describing Pasch as "a White suburban woman" who "can’t win in her own district", had already expressed concern that inner-city seats such as hers could be lost to white Democrats as a result of machinations by "non-Black forces from outside the community". Williams, like Coggs, endorsed one of Pasch's rivals. The 10th district Democratic nomination (tantamount to election in this heavily-Democratic district) was nonetheless taken by Pasch, with over 60% of the vote. She won the general election easily.

2014 
In 2014, Pasch chose not to run for re-election. After a hard-fought Democratic primary (no other parties fielded candidates), the nomination went to County Supervisor David Bowen, whom Pasch had endorsed.

Personal life 
She is married and has three children.

Electoral history

References

External links
Wisconsin Assembly - Representative Sandy Pasch official government website
Sandy Pasch official campaign website
 
Follow the Money - Sandy Pasch
2008 campaign contributions
Sandy Pasch campaign contributions at Wisconsin Democracy Campaign

1954 births
Living people
Democratic Party members of the Wisconsin State Assembly
Women state legislators in Wisconsin
Medical College of Wisconsin alumni
University of Rochester alumni
University of Wisconsin–Madison School of Nursing alumni
People from Whitefish Bay, Wisconsin
Columbia College of Nursing faculty
21st-century American women politicians
Bay View High School alumni
American women academics
21st-century American politicians